A vacuum dry box is a piece of safety equipment which can provide an inert, or controlled atmosphere for handling sensitive materials. These devices can commonly be found in the fume hoods of chemistry labs, in facilities handling deadly pathogens, in NASA moon rock handling facilities and in industrial applications.  Inert atmosphere glove boxes are also used for painting and sandblasting.

See also 
 Laboratory equipment
 Glovebox
 Dry box

References

Laboratory equipment